George Sidney Marshall (1869–1956) was the 38th mayor of Columbus, Ohio and the 35th person to serve in that office. He was elected in 1909 and served Columbus for one term. He attended the Ohio State University for his undergrad & law degree. As an author, George wrote The History of Music in Columbus Ohio as well as The Daniel Marshall Family with A Sketch of the Aaron Marshall Family on April 7, 1949.

References

Bibliography 
 
 The Daniel Marshall Family with A Sketch of the Aaron Marshall Family.
 The History of Music in Columbus Ohio.

External links 

George Sidney Marshall at Political Graveyard

Mayors of Columbus, Ohio
1869 births
1956 deaths
Ohio Republicans
Ohio State University alumni
Columbus City Council members
Ohio State University Moritz College of Law alumni